Shuy (also Romanized as Shūy, Shooy, Shevey, Shevy, and Shīvī; also known as Shiwa, Shevey-e Vasaţ, and Shevāīyā) is a village in Shahrestaneh Rural District, Now Khandan District, Dargaz County, Razavi Khorasan Province, Iran. At the 2006 census, its population was 431, in 108 families.

References 

Populated places in Dargaz County